Lakewood Park Historic District is a national historic district located at Durham, Durham County, North Carolina. The district encompasses 76 contributing buildings in a predominantly residential section of Durham. They were built between 1902 and 1952 and include notable examples of Queen Anne and Bungalow / American Craftsman style architecture.

It was listed on the National Register of Historic Places in 2003.

Notable buildings 
 Bartlett Mangum House

References

Historic districts on the National Register of Historic Places in North Carolina
Queen Anne architecture in North Carolina
Historic districts in Durham, North Carolina
National Register of Historic Places in Durham County, North Carolina
Neighborhoods in Durham, North Carolina